Jagged Edge may refer to:

Film and TV
Jagged Edge (film), a 1985 film starring Glenn Close, Jeff Bridges, Robert Loggia and Peter Coyote

Music

Groups
Jagged Edge (American group), an American R&B singing group
Jagged Edge (British band), a British rock group whose members went on to form the band Skin.

Albums
Jagged Edge (Gary Numan album), 2008
Jagged Edge (Jagged Edge album), 2006 album by the American group

See also
Jaggies, the informal name for aliasing artifacts in raster images